First Bank FC is a Nigerian soccer club run by First Bank of Nigeria and based in Lagos. The bank runs clubs in various sports, including basketball.

Current squad

 

Oladimeji Salvador

Sources
 The Punch
 P.M. news
 NFL wields big stick against Insurance, First Bank, Eko United 
 First bank may be disbanded
 Blog with game notes,pictures

External links
 First Bank official site

Football clubs in Lagos
Sports clubs in Nigeria
Financial services association football clubs in Nigeria